Sörsörian is a possibly extinct language of Vanuatu, presumably one of the Malekula Interior languages.

References

Malekula languages
Languages of Vanuatu
Extinct languages of Oceania
Critically endangered languages